Gads Hill Center is a non-profit youth education and family resource center on Chicago's South Side, United States, established in 1898. With its headquarters in Chicago, Gads Hill Center serves families in the Chicago neighborhoods of Lower West Side (Pilsen), North Lawndale and South Lawndale (Little Village) with programming that provides learning support and educational enrichment, early childhood development, and out-of-school care for children.

History
In the spring of 1898, Gads Hill Social Settlement opened its doors in a former saloon in Pilsen near what is now Damen Avenue and 22nd Street. Leila Martin, a founder and the first director, was a recent widow at age 23. She had experienced hardship but also had a vision of a better world. Gads Hill soon became a settlement house dedicated to improving the entire community.

As the 20th century began, Gads Hill's Lower West Side community was mostly populated by immigrants. Then they were Poles, Czechs, Italians, Germans and other ethnic groups. Once in Chicago, they faced lives of hardship and deprivation. Their backbreaking labor in factories, stockyards, and construction sites fueled the city's growth, its grand buildings and successful companies. But they came home to dark, crowded tenements. Their children went without food, without education, spending many hours in the gritty streets.

Gads Hill offered a place where families could be safe and unified, children could grow healthy and strong, and parents could build for the future. Soon after opening its doors, Gads Hill offered kindergarten, singing groups, cooking classes, a savings bank with 350 depositors, sewing clubs, and activities for school-age boys and girls.

Over the years, the Lower West Side community continued to evolve as new groups came seeking opportunity. The Lower West Side, particularly the Pilsen neighborhood, is now a center of Latino culture in Chicago. More than 87% of residents are of Latin American origin, predominantly Mexican. As the community changed, Gads Hill Center stood firm in its commitment to serve children and families in greatest need.

At the turn of the 21st century, Gads Hill Center expanded services to other communities in need. In 2002, the Gads Hill Child Care Center opened its doors to serve the families of Chicago's North Lawndale neighborhood.

Programs
More than 50 percent of the adults in the neighborhoods served by Gads Hill Center have not completed high school; a third of local school students drop out; and students are failing to meet state achievement test standards. Gads Hill Center is dedicated to the issue of educational support and enrichment.

Children's services
In 2002, Gads Hill Center opened the Child Development Center. It is situated in North Lawndale at the Center for Families and Neighbors of the Sinai Community Institute. The center provides pre-kindergarten services, Head Start, and child care services for 3-to 5-year-olds. Also at the Child Development Center is Club Learn, Gads Hill Center's after-school educational program for children in kindergarten through eighth grade. They provide family support service for participants and support parents in their role as their children's first teacher.

Teen Connection
Beginning in 2002, Teen Connection was created in order to fill the need for educational services for the Lower West Side and South Lawndale communities. With a primarily Latino population, most are Mexican immigrants, living in low-income households. With a high school dropout rate of 32%, the lack of academic is a serious matter. Gads Hill Center has placed 100% of its teen graduates into colleges with financial aid packets.

Incorporating 13 components into its year-long after-school program, Teen Connection provides support that extends from middle school through to the college years.

The program offers community leadership, mentorship, academic achievement, social enrichment, and college admission activities to approximately 60 low-to-average academic achieving 7th-12th grade students each year (ages 13–18).

Club Learn
Club Learn is a child development program. They serve at-risk six- to twelve-year-olds by providing services that guide them away from gangs, delinquency, and drugs.

Club Learn provides computer labs and computer instruction. Typically, kids involved in Club Learn don't have computers at home.

New Horizons
New Horizons is a mentoring program aimed to provide role models to middle school students in the Pilsen community. Pilsen ranks second among Chicago's neighborhoods for the percentage of adults (56%) without a high school degree, and nearly one of out of three students in Pilsen drops out of high school. Also, gang presence in the area exposes students to violence.

New Horizons is an early intervention program that serves at-risk middle school students. With the support of a mentor, every student is exposed to experiences that challenge and engage the student in academic and social activities.

Awards and recognition

Recent awards
The following is a list of the major awards given to Gads Hill Center during the 21st century. The list was gathered from the Awards section of the agency one-sheet.

 2009: Chosen by the Wallace Foundation as one of 14 organizations to participate in a four-year national pilot project to strengthen the financial management capacities of out-of-school-time providers.
 2007: The United Way of Metropolitan Chicago recognized Club Learn with a three-year commitment to significant funding.
 2006: Club Learn was recognized by CYS and CDBG as Region 3 Youth Net's 1st place out-of-school time program.
 2005: Recipient of the Alford-Axelson Award for Nonprofit Managerial Excellence from North Park University’s Axelson Center.
 2004: CEO Barbara Castellán received North Lawndale Employment Network’s 2004 Creating a Community That Works Award because of her "extraordinary contributions to advancing the economic stability of the residents of the community, commitment to excellence, and providing high quality service with the greatest respect to humanity."
 2004: CEO Barbara Castellán received Mujeres Latinas en Acción’s Maria ‘Maruca’ Martinez Community Service Award for her work in the community and at Gads Hill Center.
 2002: Winner of the National Association for Chicana and Chicano Studies Community Award.
 2001: Recipient of the BP Leader Award for work in collaboration with the Chicago Department of Environment to provide environmental education and a "green" setting for the Gads Hill community.
2013: Maricela Garcia became the Chief Executive Officer, the sixth CEO in the history of Gads Hill Center and the first Latina in this position.

See also
Gads Hill Center website

Notes

Organizations established in 1898
Youth organizations based in Illinois
Non-profit organizations based in Chicago
After school programs
Lower West Side, Chicago
Settlement houses in Chicago